The Veracruz Winter League  (Spanish: Liga Invernal Veracruzana de Béisbol Profesional) is a professional baseball winter league, representing the Mexican state of Veracruz, taking place between the months of October and January. It is currently made up of 6 teams and the league champion is invited to compete in the Latin American Series.

History 

The league was formed in its current iteration in 2005 by the then-state governor Fidel Herrera Beltrán as a league representing an area of Mexico not covered by the other two professional leagues, with the Mexican Pacific League covering the Pacific side of the country and the Mexican League covering inland and southern Mexico, leaving Veracruz unrepresented up to that point. The league ran for eleven seasons before it was put on hold due to lack of funding, with youth competition Veracruz State League, representing the state from that point onwards. In 2018, the president of Tobis de Acayucan, Regina Vázquez Saut, announced the revival of the league, appointing herself as the commissioner, with the first game of the revived league being played on October 27, 2018.

Current teams

Affiliations with Mexican League 
Because the Veracruz Winter League is considered a lower level than the other two professional leagues in Mexico, three of the teams have affiliations with Mexican League teams:

League champions

Championships by Team

See also 

 Baseball in Mexico
 Latin American Series
 Mexican League
 Mexican Pacific League
 Veracruz State League

References

External links 
 Official Site

Baseball leagues in Mexico
Winter baseball leagues
Sports leagues established in 2005
 
Professional sports leagues in Mexico